Henryk Czyż  (16 June 1923 – 16 January 2003) was a Polish musician with a high reputation for conducting and teaching.

He was born in Grudziądz. He was also a composer in his own right and wrote a number of books which are highly regarded. He was a champion of Polish contemporary music, particularly Penderecki whose Polish Requiem he recorded in 1985, and enjoyed an international reputation, giving concerts in Europe, South America, and the USA. He died in Warsaw.

References
Czyż Henryk at Polish Music Information Centre

1923 births
2003 deaths
Polish conductors (music)
Male conductors (music)
Academic staff of the Academy of Music in Kraków
Academic staff of the Chopin University of Music
People from Grudziądz
Home Army members
Gulag detainees
Knights of the Order of Polonia Restituta
Recipients of the Gold Cross of Merit (Poland)
Burials at Powązki Military Cemetery
20th-century conductors (music)
20th-century male musicians